Some Gorgeous Accident (1967) was James Kennaway's fifth novel and the last to be published during his lifetime. It is a portrait of a triangular relationship between photographer James Link, journalist Susan Steinberg and doctor Richard David Fiddes.

A stage adaptation of Some Gorgeous Accident was presented at the Assembly Rooms as part of the Edinburgh Festival in August 2010.

See also

 Scottish literature

References

Scottish novels
British autobiographical novels
1967 British novels
British novels adapted into plays
Novels by James Kennaway
Atheneum Books books